The Nouvelle Athènes was a café in the Place Pigalle in Paris, France. It was a meeting place for impressionist painters, including Matisse, Van Gogh and Degas. Degas painted L'Absinthe in this place. Another notable denizen was the eccentric composer Erik Satie, who played the piano in the cafe, and was there introduced to a fifteen-year-old Maurice Ravel by Ravel's father.

During the 1940s, the café was known as the Sphynx; it was a striptease club frequented by the Nazis and later by the Free French partisans. In the 1980s and 1990s, it was known as the New Moon, a rock venue where Mano Negra, the French Lovers, Noir Désir, Calvin Russel, the Naked Apes of Reason, Les Wampas, and many other groups performed.

The café building was destroyed by fire in 2004.

See also
 List of strip clubs
 Musée de la Vie romantique, Hôtel Scheffer-Renan, Paris

External links

 Les Amis de la Nouvelle Athènes
 The New Monico in 1925
 HISTORIQUE 9 Place Pigalle et 66 rue Pigalle
 Pictures
 Demolition of the New Moon

Coffeehouses and cafés in Paris
Drinking establishments in Paris
Strip clubs in France
Defunct clubs and societies
Dining clubs
Music venues in France
Cabarets in Paris
Nightlife in Paris
Former buildings and structures in Paris
Impressionist artists
2004 disestablishments in France
Former music venues in France
French companies disestablished in 2004